Italy competed at the 1924 Summer Olympics in Paris, France. 200 competitors, 196 men and 4 women, took part in 93 events in 18 sports.

Medalists

Athletics

Thirty-six athletes represented Italy in 1924. It was the nation's fifth appearance in the sport. Frigerio successfully defended his title in the 10 kilometre walk. Bertini took Italy's only other athletics medal in 1924, finishing second in the marathon.

Ranks given are within the heat.

Boxing 

Sixteen boxers represented Italy at the 1924 Games. It was the nation's second appearance in the sport. Italy was one of four nations (along with France, Great Britain, and the United States) to have two boxers in each of the eight weight classes; Italy was the only one of those four to not win any boxing medals. Castellenghi and Saraudi advanced to the semifinals in their weight classes, but both were beaten there and neither contested the bronze medal match.

Cycling

Ten cyclists represented Italy in 1924. It was the nation's fourth appearance in the sport. Italy took a single cycling medal in 1924, successfully defending the nation's championship in the team pursuit competition (though none of the winning 1920 cyclists were on the 1924 team).

Road cycling

Ranks given are within the heat.

Track cycling

Ranks given are within the heat.

Diving

A single diver represented Italy in 1924. It was the nation's fourth appearance in the sport. 1924 was the fourth consecutive Games in which Italy had sent a single man in diving; Cangiullo continued the nation's lack of finals advancement.

Ranks given are within the heat.

 Men

Equestrian

Five equestrians represented Italy in 1924. It was the nation's third appearance in the sport. Tommaso Lequio di Assaba, the defending gold medalist in the individual jumping, took silver this time. The eventing team also took bronze. It was the first time Italy finished without an equestrian gold medal.

Fencing

19 fencers, all men, represented Italy in 1924. It was the nation's fifth appearance in the sport. The absence of Nedo Nadi (by then a professional) and the heightened performance of France's Roger Ducret resulted in a relative down year for the Italian team, which defended only one of its five titles from 1920.

All six of the country's individual event competitors reached the finals; none won a medal. All three of the country's team event squads reached the finals; they won a gold medal in the sabre and a bronze in the épée. The team sabre competition pitted the defending champion Italian squad against a powerhouse Hungary team which had been excluded from competition in 1920. The four-team final pool was dominated by the two teams, and the match between them decided gold. That match was one of the closest of the 1924 Games, with the teams splitting the bouts 8 to 8 and Italy winning via tie-breaker: 50 touches to 46.

 Men

Ranks given are within the pool.

Football

Italy competed in the Olympic football tournament for the third time in 1924.

 Round 1

 Round 2

 Quarterfinals

Final rank 5th place

Roster

Giovanni De Prà
Giampiero Combi
Gastone Baldi
Giuseppe Aliberti
Adolfo Baloncieri
Ottavio Barbieri
Luigi Burlando
Umberto Caligaris
Leopoldo Conti
Giuseppe Della Valle
Virgilio Levratto
Mario Magnozzi
Virginio Rosetta
Renzo De Vecchi
Severino Rosso
Antonio Fayenz
Antonio Janni
Antonio Bruna
Mario Ardissone
Feliciano Monti
Giuseppe Calvi
Cesare Martin

Gymnastics

Eight gymnasts represented Italy in 1924. It was the nation's fifth appearance in the sport. The Italian team won its third consecutive gold medal in the team event (in part at least due to Czechoslovakia's failure to finish), though were kept out of the individual all-around medals after having had an individual all-around gold medalist the previous two Games.

Mandrini had the best all-around result of the Italians, placing fourth despite earning no better than seventh in any single apparatus. Francesco Martino took the gold medal in the rings, while Zampori earned bronze in the parallel bars.

Artistic

Modern pentathlon

Four pentathletes represented Italy in 1924. It was the nation's second appearance in the sport.

Rowing

17 rowers represented Italy in 1924. It was the nation's fourth appearance in the sport. Italy took two medals.

Ranks given are within the heat.

Sailing

Three sailors represented Italy in 1924. It was the nation's debut in the sport.

Shooting

Fourteen sport shooters represented Italy in 1924. It was the nation's third appearance in the sport.

Swimming

Ranks given are within the heat.

 Men

Tennis

 Men

 Women

 Mixed

Water polo

Italy made its second Olympic water polo appearance.

 Roster
 Tito Ambrosini
 Ottone Andreancich
 Mario Balla
 Gian Battista Benvenuto
 Arnoldo Berruti
 Mario Cazzaniga
 Eugenio Della Casa
 Achille Francesco Gavoglio
 Emilio Gavoglio
 Carmine De Luca
 Giuseppe M. Valle

First round

Weightlifting

Wrestling

Freestyle wrestling

 Men's

Greco-Roman

 Men's

Art Competitions

References

External links
Official Olympic Reports
International Olympic Committee results database
 

Nations at the 1924 Summer Olympics
1924
Olympics